() is the motto of both the royal coat of arms of the Kingdom of Scotland and royal coat of arms of the United Kingdom used in Scotland. Contemporary versions of the royal arms show an abbreviated motto, in the form of in defens or, where English is used as an alternative, in defence. The motto appears above the crest of the arms, in the tradition of Scottish heraldry.

Origins 

(An embroidered wall hanging depicting these arms is displayed in the Great Hall at Stirling Castle). Later versions of the arms which feature the abbreviated form  include the armorial by Sir David Lyndsay of the Mount, which appears in his Register of Scottish Arms (1542).

The motto is also associated with an old Scots prayer, of which there are several versions where In my defens God me defend appears as the opening line, including:

And:

Also, in the form of a couplet:

Nemo me impune lacessit

During the reign of Charles II (1660–1685), the royal arms used in Scotland were augmented with the inclusion of the Latin motto of the Order of the Thistle, the highest chivalric order of the Kingdom of Scotland. The motto of the Order of the Thistle, Nemo me impune lacessit, appears on a blue scroll overlying the compartment. (Previously, only the collar of the Order of the Thistle had appeared on the arms.)

The addition by King Charles of  ensured that the blazon of his royal arms used in Scotland complemented that of his royal arms used elsewhere, in that two mottoes were displayed. The blazon used elsewhere had included the French motto of the arms, Dieu et mon droit, together with the Old French motto of the Order of the Garter, the highest chivalric order of the Kingdom of England. The motto of the Order of the Garter, appears on a representation of the garter surrounding the shield. Thenceforth, the versions of the Royal arms used in Scotland and elsewhere were to include both the motto of the arms of the respective kingdom and the motto of the associated order of chivalry.

Confusion 
The rules governing heraldry and armorial achievements in England have possibly resulted in a degree of confusion as to the status of the mottoes associated with both the royal coat of arms of Scotland and those of the United Kingdom used in Scotland. In English heraldry the motto is placed beneath the shield, whereas in Scottish heraldry the motto is placed above the crest. Appearing beneath the shield may have led to the conclusion that Nemo me impune lacessit is the motto of the royal arms, whereas historical evidence coupled with the conventions of heraldry in Scotland would suggest that In my defens God me defend is the motto of the royal arms and therefore the motto of Scotland itself.

Usage 

The motto In defens not only appears on the royal arms, but also, in conjunction with the crest of the Royal arms, upon the logo of both the Crown Office and Procurator Fiscal Service and the General Register Office for Scotland.

References

External links 
Arms on publication dated 1606 showing full motto 
Wood carving of arms of Mary, Queen of Scots, showing full motto

Scottish monarchy
British monarchy
Scotland
National symbols of Scotland
National symbols of the United Kingdom
National mottos